Leo Groenewegen (born August 13, 1965) is a former all-star offensive lineman in the Canadian Football League. He played from 1987 to 2004 for the Ottawa Rough Riders, British Columbia Lions and Edmonton Eskimos. He was an All-Star three times and won one Grey Cup with Edmonton.  He holds the CFL record for consecutive starts by a non-kicker (252). He has been a member of the Volunteer Fire Department in Nanoose Bay, British Columbia since 2008.

References

Specific

1965 births
Living people
BC Lions players
Canadian football offensive linemen
Edmonton Elks players
Ottawa Rough Riders players
Canadian football people from Vancouver
Players of Canadian football from British Columbia
UBC Thunderbirds football players